The KM de Vantagens Hall (originally known as the Marista Hall) is an events centre in Belo Horizonte, Brazil, located on the campus of the Colégio Marista Dom Silvério. The goal was to create an environment with a great diversity of spaces. It includes a multipurpose room, a theater, an arena, courts, and a parking lot; this structure is suitable for a wide variety of cultural, artistic, and sports events, be it of a technical, commercial or recreational nature.

About the centre

Construction began in March 1997, and the original deadline was December 1998. However, this deadline was progressively postponed, and the building did not open until June 25, 2003.

Since a good part of the construction was financed by students of the Colégio Marista Dom Silvério, Marista Hall is a target of jokes and dissatisfaction, because thousands of students paid for it but never benefited from it, having left school before construction was completed. Further dissatisfaction came when Chevrolet began to sponsor the centre in 2005; as a result the place changed its name to "Chevrolet Hall". There is a community in orkut dedicated to "refusing" the new name, mostly former and current students of college who feel their contributions to the site should be recognized in its name. In 2016, GM chose not to renew the contract for naming rights and the venue became known as the "BH Hall" until March 2017, when fuel company Ipiranga secured the naming rights. Beginning 19 March 2017, the centre is known as the "KM de Vantagens Hall". It is considered the biggest house of shows of BH.

Noted performers

A-ha
Akon
Alanis Morissette
All Time Low
Angra
Avril Lavigne
Backstreet Boys
Bob Dylan
Chris Brown
Colbie Cailat
The Cranberries
Deep Purple
Demi Lovato
Dream Theater
Exodus
Faith No More
Fifth Harmony
Hanson
Incubus
Imagine Dragons
Interpol
James Blunt
Jason Mraz
Jethro Tull
Jonas Brothers
Joss Stone
Judas Priest
Keane
Kreator
Lana Del Rey
Lauryn Hill
McFly
Megadeth
Motion City Soundtrack
Nightwish
Norah Jones
Now United
The Offspring
P.O.D.
Paramore
Pet Shop Boys
Queensrÿche
Ringo Starr & His All-Starr Band
Roxette
Scorpions
Seal
Shaman
Simple Plan
Slayer
Snow Patrol
Steve Vai
Stratovarius
Whitesnake

References

Concert halls in Brazil
Indoor arenas in Brazil
Sports venues in Belo Horizonte
Convention centres in Brazil
Chevrolet
Tourist attractions in Belo Horizonte
Marist Brothers